Jeremy Black may refer to:

Sir Jeremy Black (Royal Navy officer) (1932–2015), British admiral
Jeremy Black, drummer for Apollo Sunshine
Jeremy Black (historian) (born 1955), British historian
Jeremy Black (Assyriologist) (1951–2004), British Assyriologist and Sumerologist
Jeremy Black, child actor in the 1978 film The Boys from Brazil
Jeremy Black, co-founder of the acai-based company Sambazon

See also
Jerry Black (disambiguation)